Noah is an unincorporated community in Jefferson County, in the U.S. state of Georgia.

History
A post office called Noah was established in 1885, and remained in operation until 1908. The community was named after Noah, a character in the Hebrew Bible.

References

Unincorporated communities in Jefferson County, Georgia
Unincorporated communities in Georgia (U.S. state)